Jacob Eckhardt (February 7, 1835 – November 1, 1881) was a member of the Wisconsin State Assembly during the 1879 and 1880 sessions. Eckhardt was born on February 7, 1835, in Ingolsheim, France. He arrived in Wisconsin in 1855, and in 1866, he settled in De Soto, Wisconsin. He was a Republican.

Eckhardt was badly wounded in a shooting in 1874. He died unexpectedly in Milwaukee, Wisconsin in 1881, and his death was attributed to the old injury.

References

External links

People from De Soto, Wisconsin
1835 births
1881 deaths
Republican Party members of the Wisconsin State Assembly